The yawara is a Japanese weapon used in various martial arts.

Yawara may also refer to:

Yawara, an obsolete term for jujutsu (based on an alternate pronunciation of the 柔 kanji)
Yawara!, a manga series, as well as the anime and live-action series based on the manga
"Yawara-chan", the nickname of Ryoko Tani, after the main character in the Yawara! manga
Yawara, Ibaraki, a village in Ibaraki Prefecture, Japan

People with the given name
, Japanese politician

Japanese masculine given names